The Southern bread riots were events of civil unrest in the Confederacy during the American Civil War, perpetrated mostly by women in March and April 1863. During these riots, which occurred in cities throughout the South, hungry women and men invaded and looted various shops and stores.

Causes
The riots were triggered by the women's lack of money, provisions, and food. All were the result of multiple factors, mostly related to the Civil War:
 Inflation had caused prices to soar while incomes had not kept pace.
 Refugees had flooded the cities, causing severe shortages of housing and overwhelming the old food supply system. Richmond's population went from 38,000 people in 1860 to over 100,000 by 1863.
 Food supplies in rural areas were running short and less food was exported to cities; foraging armies, both Union and Confederate, ravaged crops and killed farm animals.
 Many cities—especially Richmond—were at the end of long supply lines, and internal transportation became increasingly difficult.
 Salt, which at the time was the only practical meat preservative, was very expensive (if available at all) because it was generally an imported item. The Union blockade prevented imports, and the capture of Avery Island, Louisiana, with its salt-mine, exacerbated the problem.
 The Confederate States Army seized provisions meant for civilian use to feed its soldiers, which in turn spurred farmers to withhold shipments.
 As shortages became more prevalent in urban areas, those who could afford to do so began to hoard what they could, leaving fewer supplies for others.

Citizens, mostly women, began to protest the exorbitant price of bread. The protesters believed a negligent government and speculators were to blame. To show their displeasure, many protesters turned to violence. Robberies of grocery and merchandise stores were happening on nearly a daily basis. Riots took place over food or flour in Atlanta (March 16), Salisbury, North Carolina (March 18), Mobile and High Point (March 25), and Petersburg (April 1), but the largest and most important of these was in Richmond on April 2.

Richmond bread riots
On April 2, 1863, in the Confederate capital of Richmond, Virginia, about 5,500 people, mostly poor women, broke into shops and began seizing food, clothing, shoes, and even jewelry before the militia arrived to restore order. Tens of thousands of dollars worth of items were stolen. No one died and few were injured. The riot was organized and instigated by Mary Jackson, a peddler and the mother of a soldier.

President Jefferson Davis pleaded with the women and even threw them money from his pockets, asking them to disperse, saying "You say you are hungry and have no money; here, this is all I have". The mayor read the Riot Act; the governor called out the militia, and it restored order.

To protect morale, the Confederate government suppressed most news reports of the riot itself. Many newspapers, however, were keen to report on the trials of the participants themselves, and they usually portrayed those people in an unflattering light, suggesting that they were not actually starving, or that the rioters were mostly "Yankees" or lower-class people, allowing many upper-class citizens to ignore the scope of the problems. However, that only served to deepen the feelings of resentment and injustice among the lower classes, leading to the sentiment that the Civil War was "a rich man's war, but a poor man's fight". 

In Richmond, measures were undertaken to alleviate starvation and inflation for poor people, and special committees were held to classify "worthy poor" from "unworthy poor", the city then opened special markets for "worthy poor" citizens to purchase goods and fuel at significantly reduced prices.

See also
 Economy of the Confederate States of America
 List of food riots
 List of incidents of civil unrest in the United States

References

Further reading
 Bellemare, Marc F. "Rising food prices, food price volatility, and social unrest." American Journal of Agricultural Economics 97.1 (2015): 1–21. online

 Chesson, Michael B. "Harlots or Heroines? A New Look at the Richmond Bread Riot." Virginia Magazine of History and Biography 92#2 (1984): 131–175. 
 
 Harper, Judith E. Women during the civil war: An encyclopedia (Routledge, 2004).
 Hurt, R. Douglas. Agriculture and the Confederacy: Policy, Productivity, and Power in the Civil War South (U North Carolina Press, 2015).
 Lerner, Eugene M. "Money, prices, and wages in the Confederacy, 1861–65." Journal of Political Economy (1955): 20–40. 
 
 Rable, George C. Civil Wars: Women and the Crisis of Southern Nationalism (U of Illinois Press, 1989).
 Smith, Andrew F. "Did hunger defeat the Confederacy." North & South 13.1 (2011): 7–10.
 Smith, Andrew F. Starving the South: How the North Won the Civil War (Macmillan, 2011).
 
 Williams, Teresa Crisp, and David Williams. "'The Women Rising': Cotton, Class, and Confederate Georgia's Rioting Women." Georgia Historical Quarterly 86.1 (2002): 49–83. 

1863 riots
1863 in the Confederate States of America
Food riots
Riots and civil unrest during the American Civil War
Riots and civil disorder in Virginia
Riots and civil disorder in Georgia (U.S. state)
Riots and civil disorder in North Carolina
1863 in Georgia (U.S. state)
1863 in Virginia
1863 in North Carolina
March 1863 events
April 1863 events
Political riots in the United States